Simon J. Sheather is an Australian-American academic. He became the 8th dean of the University of Kentucky’s Gatton College of Business and Economics on July 1st, 2018. A Fellow of the American Statistical Association, Sheather is known for the Sheather-Jones bandwidth selection method for kernel density estimation.

Early life and education
Sheather was born and raised in Australia, the son of a bank clerk and a nurse. Sheather graduated with 1st Class Honours in mathematical statistics from the University of Melbourne and earned his Ph.D. in statistics from La Trobe University.

Career
His academic career includes professorships at the University of New South Wales and Texas A&M University as well as visiting professorships at Pennsylvania State University and the Stern School of Business at New York University. While at Texas A&M, he started two professional master’s programs.

In 2021, Sheather was named as the first holder of the Truist Chair in Data Analytics.

Selected works
 Simon, Sheather (2009), A Modern Approach to Regression with R, Springer
 Sheather, S.J.; Jones, M.C. (1991). "A reliable data-based bandwidth selection method for kernel density estimation". Journal of the Royal Statistical Society, Series B. 53 (3): 683–690. doi:10.1111/j.2517-6161.1991.tb01857.x. JSTOR 2345597.

Recognition
Sheather was named a Fellow of the American Statistical Association in 2001.

References

External links 
 Sheather Data Analytics Official website
 Simon Sheather publications indexed by Google Scholar

American statisticians
Australian statisticians
Fellows of the American Statistical Association
University of Kentucky faculty
La Trobe University alumni
University of Melbourne alumni
Living people
Year of birth missing (living people)